Ida-Lova Saga Lind, known as Ida-Lova, (born 2 August 2004) is a Swedish singer and songwriter. She participated in Melodifestivalen 2023, where she performed the song "Låt hela stan se på" a song she co-wrote together with Andreas "Giri" Lindbergh, Joy and Linnea Deb. Ida-Lova is the daughter of Christine Meltzer.

Dicography

Singles

References

2004 births
Living people
Swedish singers by century
Swedish women singers
Melodifestivalen contestants of 2023